The Cretaceous Terrestrial Revolution (abbreviated KTR), also known as the Angiosperm Terrestrial Revolution (ATR) by authors who consider it to have lasted into the Palaeogene, describes the intense diversification of angiosperms, insects, reptiles, birds, and mammals during the Middle to Late Cretaceous, from around 125 Ma to 80 Ma. Alternatively, according to Michael Benton, the ATR is proposed to have lasted from 100 Ma, when the first highly diverse angiosperm leaf floras are known, to 50 Ma, during the Early Eocene Climatic Optimum, by which point most crown lineages of angiosperms had evolved.

The KTR was enabled by the dispersed positions of the continents and the formation of new oceans during the Cretaceous in the aftermath of the breakup of Pangaea in the preceding Jurassic period, which enhanced the hydrological cycle and promoted the expansion of temperate climatic zones, fuelling radiations of angiosperms.

Before Lloyd et al.'s 2008 paper described the KTR, it had been widely accepted in paleontology that new families of dinosaurs evolved during the Middle to Late Cretaceous, including the euhadrosaurs, neoceratopsians, ankylosaurids, pachycephalosaurs, carcharodontosaurines, troodontids, dromaeosaurs, and ornithomimosaurs. However, the authors of the paper have suggested that the apparent "new diversification" of dinosaurs during this time is due to sampling biases in the fossil record, and better preserved fossils in Cretaceous age sediments than in earlier Triassic or Jurassic sediments. 

A comprehensive molecular study of evolution of mammals at the taxonomic level of family also showed important diversification during the KTR. Similarly, bee pollinator diversification strongly correlates with angiosperm flower appearance and specialization during the same era. Molecular clock analyses of angiosperm evolution suggest that crown group angiosperms may have diverged up to 100 million years before the start of the KTR, although this is possibly due to artefacts of the inabilities of molecular clock estimates to account for explosive accelerations in evolution that may have caused the extremely fast diversification of angiosperms shortly after their first appearance in the fossil record.

For nearly the entirety of Earth's history, including most of the Phanerozoic eon, marine species diversity exceeded terrestrial species diversity, a pattern which was reversed during the Middle Cretaceous as a result of the KTR in what has been termed a biological "great divergence", named after the historical Great Divergence.

See also
Cretaceous–Paleogene boundary (K–T boundary)
 Cretaceous–Paleogene extinction event

References

Cretaceous events
Cretaceous life